Argas is a rural locality (a selo), the administrative centre of and one of two settlements, in addition to Kalvitsa, in Kuokuysky Rural Okrug of Kobyaysky District in the Sakha Republic, Russia. Its population as of the 2002 Census was 616.

Geography
The village is located by the Lungkha river.

References

Notes

Sources
Official website of the Sakha Republic. Registry of the Administrative-Territorial Divisions of the Sakha Republic. Kobyaysky District. 

Rural localities in Kobyaysky District